Carex pairae is a species of perennial grass in the family Cyperaceae (sedges). They have a self-supporting growth form and simple, broad leaves. Individuals can grow to 0.21 m tall.

Sources

References 

pairae
Flora of Malta